St. Paul's Methodist Church, and variations, including names with St. Paul, Episcopal or Protestant may refer to:

St. Paul's Methodist Episcopal Church (Point Arena, California)
St. Paul's Methodist Episcopal Church (Hartford, Connecticut)
Old St. Paul's Methodist Episcopal Church (Odessa, Delaware), listed on the NRHP in Delaware
St. Paul Methodist Episcopal Church (Rushville, Indiana)
St. Paul United Methodist Church (Cedar Rapids, Iowa)
St. Paul's Methodist Episcopal Church (Westover, Maryland)
St. Paul's Methodist Protestant Church (Culbertson, Nebraska)
St. Paul's Methodist Church (Oyster Bay, New York)
St. Paul's Methodist Church (Little Rock, South Carolina)

See also
 St. Paul A.M.E. Church (disambiguation)
 St. Paul's United Methodist Church (disambiguation)
 St. Paul's Church (disambiguation)